Missa Sanctae Caeciliae (Saint Cecilia Mass) in G major, ZWV 1, is a mass for voices and orchestra by Jan Dismas Zelenka. It was completed in 1711 as his first work for the Dresden court.

Description
Missa Sanctae Caeciliae was the first composition Jan Dismas Zelenka presented after he was employed as a musician at the court in Dresden in 1711. He arrived from Prague in 1710 to serve as a double bass player in the court orchestra, and turned to composing sacred music for the court which had converted to the Catholic Church. The mass, named after Saint Cecilia, the patron saint of music, was first performed at the Catholic Court Chapel on 22 November that year, and repeated there on 12 January 1712, this time in the presence of the Saxon Elector and Polish King, August II. Zelenka revised it several times, and used some parts for other purposes.

Structure and scoring 
Zelenka structured the mass in several individual movements, subdividing the parts of the liturgical text especially in the Gloria and the Credo. He scored it for SATB soloists and choir, two oboes, bassoon, strings and continuo. The mass is in G major and takes about 45 minutes to perform.

 Kyrie
 Gloria
 Gloria in excelsis Deo
 Laudamus te
 Gratias agimus tibi
 Qui tollis
 Qui tollis, suscipe
 Quoniam tu solus Sanctus
 Cum Sancto Spiritu
 Credo
 Credo in unum Deum
 Qui propter nos homines
 Et incarnatus
 Crucifixus
 Et resurrexit
 Et unam, sanctam
 Et vitam venturi saeculi
 Sanctus
 Benedictus
 Agnus Dei
 Agnus Dei
 Dona nobis pacem

In this early work, described as "masterful" ("grande maîtrise") and "glorious", Zelenka used several features that became characteristic for his music, including "jaunty" rhythms, "intense" harmonies, vocal lines in high register and long fugue subjects. Zelenkas set Laudamus and Quoniam from the Gloria for soloists. The solo voices at times "oppose the choir dramatically", and choral fugues of great scope end the extended movements. The music is a precursor of the Viennese mass that flourished in the middle of the 18th century.

Recordings 

A reviewer noted that the performers rose to the challenges with class.

References 

Caeciliae, Missa Sanctae
1711 compositions